The 2019 Purdue Boilermakers baseball team was a baseball team that represented Purdue University in the 2019 NCAA Division I baseball season. The Boilermakers were members of the Big Ten Conference and played their home games at Alexander Field in West Lafayette, Indiana. They were led by third-year head coach Mark Wasikowski.

Previous season
The Boilermakers finished the 2018 NCAA Division I baseball season 38–21 overall (17–6 conference) and second place in conference standings. Following the conclusion of the regular season, the Boilermakers were selected to play in the 2018 NCAA Tournament, beginning in the Chapel Hill Regional. The Boilermakers would eventually lose in the second round of the Chapel Hill Regional to Houston by a score of 4–8.

MLB Draft 
The following Boilermakers on the 2018 roster were selected in the 2018 Major League Baseball draft:

* indicates draftee had no more college eligibility

Preseason
On July 2, 2018, Purdue hired Seattle Redhawks' Elliott Cribby to join the baseball team as pitching coach, replacing Steve Holm who left for the head baseball coaching position with Illinois State. On July 4, 2018, Purdue hired Cooper Fouts from Pepperdine as an assistant to round out the team's staff.

Roster

Schedule

! style="" | Regular Season
|- valign="top" 

|- bgcolor="#ffcccc"
| 1 || February 15 || at  || Pete Taylor Park • Hattiesburg, Mississippi || 6–7 || Strickland (1–0) || Peterson (0–1) || None || – || 0–1 || 0–0
|- bgcolor="#ffcccc"
| 2 || February 16 || at Southern Miss || Pete Taylor Park • Hattiesburg, Mississippi || 2–4 || Powers (1–0) || Beard (0–1) || C. Carrol (1) || 4,078 || 0–2 || 0–0
|- bgcolor="#ffcccc"
| 3 || February 17 || at Southern Miss || Pete Taylor Park • Hattiesburg, Mississippi || 7–16 || Stanley (1–0) || Peterson (0–2) || None || 3,539 || 0–3 || 0–0
|- bgcolor="#ffcccc"
| 4 || February 22 || at #23 Texas || UFCU Disch–Falk Field • Austin, Texas || 2–7 || Henley (1–0) || Beard (0–2) || None || – || 0–4 || 0–0
|- bgcolor="#ffcccc"
| 5 || February 23 || at #23 Texas || UFCU Disch–Falk Field • Austin, Texas || 6–13 || Elder (1–0) || Parker (0–2) || None || – || 0–5 || 0–0
|- bgcolor="#ccffcc"
| 6 || February 23 || at #23 Texas || UFCU Disch–Falk Field • Austin, Texas || 4–0 || Hofstra (1–0) || Stevens (0–1) || None || 6,147 || 1–5 || 0–0
|- bgcolor="#ffcccc"
| 7 || February 24 || at #23 Texas || UFCU Disch–Falk Field • Austin, Texas || 0–3 || Whelan (1–0) || P. J. Smith (0–1) || Quintanilla (1) || 5,155 || 1–6 || 0–0
|-

|- bgcolor="#ffcccc"
| 8 || March 1 || at  || J. L. Johnson Stadium • Tulsa, Oklahoma || 1–5 || McMinn (2–1) || Parker (0–2) || None || – || 1–7 || 0–0
|- bgcolor="#ffcccc"
| 9 || March 1 || at Oral Roberts || J. L. Johnson Stadium • Tulsa, Oklahoma || 4–10 || Larkins (1–0) || Bohm (0–1) || None || 684 || 1–8 || 0–0
|- bgcolor="#ffcccc"
| 10 || March 2 || at Oral Roberts || J. L. Johnson Stadium • Tulsa, Oklahoma || 2–3 || Swift (1–0) || Johnson (0–1) || Wolf (2) || 716 || 1–9 || 0–0
|- bgcolor="#bbbbbb"
| 11 || March 3 || at Oral Roberts || J. L. Johnson Stadium • Tulsa, Oklahoma || Cancelled || – || – || – || – || 1–9 || 0–0
|- bgcolor="#ffcccc"
| 12 || March 9 || vs  || Big League Camp • Marion, North Carolina || 3–9 || Georgini (1–0) || Hofstra (1–1) || None || 113 || 1–10 || 0–0
|- bgcolor="#ccffcc"
| 13 || March 9 || vs NJIT || Big League Camp • Marion, North Carolina || 9–8 || Peterson (1–2) || Hunter (1–1) || None || 113 || 2–10 || 0–0
|- bgcolor="#ccffcc"
| 14 || March 10 || vs NJIT || Big League Camp • Marion, North Carolina || 3–2 || Moore (1–0) || Lubreski (2–2) || Johnson (1) || 123 || 3–10 || 0–0
|- bgcolor="#ffcccc"
| 15 || March 12 ||  || Alexander Field • West Lafayette, Indiana || 1–6 || McIntosh (2–0) || Wade (0–1) || None || 883 || 3–11 || 0–0
|- bgcolor="#ffcccc"
| 16 || March 13 || at Indiana State || Bob Warn Field at Sycamore Stadium • Terre Haute, Indiana || 3–4 || Cross (2–0) || Peterson (1–3) || Grauer (2) || 653 || 3–12 || 0–0
|- bgcolor="#ffcccc"
| 17 || March 15 || at  || Rudy Abbott Field • Jacksonville, Alabama || 0–4 || Farmer (2–0) || Bohm (0–2) || Edwards (4) || 970 || 3–13 || 0–0
|- bgcolor="#ccffcc"
| 18 || March 16 || at Jacksonville State || Rudy Abbott Field • Jacksonville, Alabama || 9–5 || P. J. Smith (1–1) || Fortner (1–3) || None || 789 || 4–13 || 0–0
|- bgcolor="#ffcccc"
| 19 || March 17 || at Jacksonville State || Rudy Abbott Field • Jacksonville, Alabama || 0–3 || Woods (2–0) || Beard (0–3) || Edwards (5) || 1,017 || 4–14 || 0–0
|- bgcolor="#ffcccc"
| 20 || March 19 || at  || Ball Diamond • Muncie, Indiana || 0–6 || McDermott (2–0) || Peterson (1–4) || None || 411 || 4–15 || 0–0
|- bgcolor="#ccffcc"
| 21 || March 20 ||  || Alexander Field • West Lafayette, Indiana || 9–2 || Wade (1–1) || Stopp (1–1) || None || 862 || 5–15 || 0–0
|- bgcolor="#ccffcc"
| 22 || March 22 || at  || Rocky Miller Park • Evanston, Illinois || 5–2 || P. J. Smith (2–1) || Lavelle (1–3) || Hofstra (1) || 232 || 6–15 || 1–0
|- bgcolor="#ffcccc"
| 23 || March 23 || at Northwestern || Rocky Miller Park • Evanston, Illinois || 1–2 || Christie (1–2) || Bohm (0–3) || Paciorek (3) || 392 || 6–16 || 1–1
|- bgcolor="#ccffcc"
| 24 || March 24 || at Northwestern || Rocky Miller Park • Evanston, Illinois || 9–7 || Moore (2–0) || Hanks (2–1) || Hofstra (2) || 212 || 7–16 || 2–1
|- bgcolor="#ccffcc"
| 25 || March 25 ||  || Alexander Field • West Lafayette, Indiana || 5–1 || Wade (2–1) || Fricke (0–1) || None || 1,135 || 8–16 || 2–1
|- bgcolor="#ccffcc"
| 26 || March 29 ||  || Alexander Field • West Lafayette, Indiana || 1–0 || P. J. Smith (3–1) || Biasi (2–3) || Hofstra (3) || 961 || 9–16 || 3–1
|- bgcolor="#ccffcc"
| 27 || March 31 || Penn State || Alexander Field • West Lafayette, Indiana || 2–1 || Hofstra (2–1) || Virbitsky (1–1) || None || 949 || 10–16 || 4–1
|- bgcolor="#bbbbbb"
| 28 || March 31 || Penn State || Alexander Field • West Lafayette, Indiana || Cancelled || – || – || – || – || – || –
|-

|- bgcolor="#ffcccc"
| 29 || April 3 || Indiana State || Alexander Field • West Lafayette, Indiana || 3–4 || Ward (2–0) || Johnson (0–2) || Grauer (4) || 1,430 || 10–17 || 4–1
|- bgcolor="#ffcccc"
| 30 || April 5 || at  || Hawks Field • Lincoln, Nebraska || 0–17 || Waldron (4–0) || P. J. Smith (3–2) || None || 5,038 || 10–18 || 4–2
|- bgcolor="#ffcccc"
| 31 || April 6 || at Nebraska || Hawks Field • Lincoln, Nebraska || 4–13 || Mi. Waldron (1–0) || Bohm (0–4) || Palkert (1) || 5,897 || 10–19 || 4–3
|- bgcolor="#ffcccc"
| 32 || April 7 || at Nebraska || Hawks Field • Lincoln, Nebraska || 5–9 || Eddins (2–2) || Beard (0–4) || None || 5,346 || 10–20 || 4–4
|- bgcolor="#ffcccc"
| 33 || April 10 || at Indiana || Bart Kaufman Field • Bloomington, Indiana || 6–7 || Sloan (2–2) || Hofstra (2–2) || None || 2,664 || 10–21 || 4–4
|- bgcolor="#ffcccc"
| 34 || April 12 || at  || Duane Banks Field • Iowa City, Iowa || 4–10 || McDonald (3–3) || P. J. Smith (3–3) || None || 1,385 || 10–22 || 4–5
|- bgcolor="#ccffcc"
| 35 || April 13 || at Iowa || Duane Banks Field • Iowa City, Iowa || 9–5 || Moore (3–0) || Davitt (1–1) || None || 1,414 || 11–22 || 5–5
|- bgcolor="#ffcccc"
| 36 || April 13 || at Iowa || Duane Banks Field • Iowa City, Iowa || 3–6 || Judkins (4–3) || Beard (0–5) || Leonard (8) || 1,414 || 11–23 || 5–6
|- bgcolor="#ccffcc"
| 37 || April 16 ||  || Alexander Field • West Lafayette, Indiana || 5–3 || Johnson (1–2) || Voss (2–1) || Hofstra (4) || 1,726 || 12–23 || 5–6
|- bgcolor="#ffcccc"
| 38 || April 19 || at  || Bainton Field • Piscataway, New Jersey || 0–2 || Rutkowski (2–3) || Bohm (0–5) || S. Brito (7) || 273 || 12–24 || 5–7
|- bgcolor="#ccffcc"
| 39 || April 20 || at Rutgers || Bainton Field • Piscataway, New Jersey || 6–2 || Johnson (2–2) || Genuario (2–3) || Hofstra (5) || 561 || 13–24 || 6–7
|- bgcolor="#ffcccc"
| 40 || April 21 || at Rutgers || Bainton Field • Piscataway, New Jersey || 1–6 || Murray (3–3) || Kolak (0–1) || S. Brito (8) || 386 || 13–25 || 6–8
|- bgcolor="#ccffcc"
| 41 || April 23 ||  || Alexander Field • West Lafayette, Indiana || 10–1 || Brooks (1–0) || Venturi (0–4) || None || 963 || 14–25 || 6–8
|- bgcolor="#ccffcc"
| 42 || April 24 || Purdue Fort Wayne || Alexander Field • West Lafayette, Indiana || 11–2 || P. J. Smith (4–3) || Odzark (0–7) || None || 1,370 || 15–25 || 6–8
|- bgcolor="#ccffcc"
| 43 || April 26 ||  || Alexander Field • West Lafayette, Indiana || 8–3 || Johnson 3–2 || Dodd (4–5) || None || 1,158 || 16–25 || 6–8
|- bgcolor="#ffcccc"
| 44 || April 27 || Southeast Missouri State || Alexander Field • West Lafayette, Indiana || 2–3 || Sachse (5–5) || Bohm (0–6) || Stretch (4) || 1,288 || 16–26 || 6–8
|- bgcolor="#ccffcc"
| 45 || April 28 || Southeast Missouri State || Alexander Field • West Lafayette, Indiana || 6–2 || Kulak (1–1) || Niznik (2–3) || Peterson (1) || 1,284 || 17–26 || 6–8
|-

|- bgcolor="#ccffcc"
| 46 || May 3 ||  || Alexander Field • West Lafayette, Indiana || 2–0 || Moore (4–0) || Eira (2–8) || Hofsta (6) || 1,360 || 18–26 || 7–8
|- bgcolor="#ffcccc"
| 47 || May 4 || Michigan State || Alexander Field • West Lafayette, Indiana || 1–5 || Tyranski (2–7) || Bohm (0–7) || None || 1,625 || 18–27 || 7–9
|- bgcolor="#ffcccc"
| 48 || May 5 || Michigan State || Alexander Field • West Lafayette, Indiana || 4–7 || Panaranto (3–0) || Parker (0–3) || Diaz (6) || 1,939 || 18–28 || 7–10
|- bgcolor="#ccffcc"
| 49 || May 7 || Ball State || Alexander Field • West Lafayette, Indiana || 9–3 || Kulak (2–1) || Jaksich (0–2) || None || 1,246 || 19–28 || 7–10
|- bgcolor="#ffcccc"
| 50 || May 10 || at #25  || Illinois Field • Champaign, Illinois || 2–5 || Leland (4–2) || Bohm (0–8) || None || 1,027 || 19–29 || 7–11
|- bgcolor="#ffcccc"
| 51 || May 11 || at #25 Illinois || Illinois Field • Champaign, Illinois || 4–5 || Schmitt (4–2) || Peterson (1–5) || Sefcik (2) || 502 || 19–30 || 7–12
|- bgcolor="#ffcccc"
| 52 || May 12 || at #25 Illinois || Illinois Field • Champaign, Illinois || 4–6 || Harris (4–2) || Wade (2–2) || Acton (17) || 614 || 19–31 || 7–13
|- bgcolor="#ccffcc"
| 53 || May 14 ||  || Alexander Field • West Lafayette, Indiana || 4–3 || Moore (5–0) || Schramm (2–2) || Hofstra (7) || 1,526 || 20–31 || 7–13
|- bgcolor="#ffcccc"
| 54 || May 16 ||  || Alexander Field • West Lafayette, Indiana || 0–7 || Burhenn (6–3) || Johnson (3–3 || None || 1,325 || 20–32 || 7–14
|- bgcolor="#ffcccc"
| 55 || May 17 || Ohio State || Alexander Field • West Lafayette, Indiana || 1–6 || Lonsway (7–4) || P. J. Smith (4–4) || None || 1,573 || 20–33 || 7–15
|- bgcolor="#ffcccc"
| 56 || May 18 || Ohio State || Alexander Field • West Lafayette, Indiana || 11–13 || Magno (4–3) || Bohm (0–9) || None || 1,512 || 20–34 || 7–16
|-

Awards

Conference awards

References

Purdue
Purdue Boilermakers baseball seasons
Purdue